The Insight Film Festival (IFF) is a biennial short film event focusing on interfaith films that has taken place in the UK from 2007 to the 4th Festival, held in 2013. IFF claims to be the UK's only interfaith film festival and has the tagline "Faith in Film". IFF exists to encourage filmmakers throughout the world to make films about the subject of faith, irrespective of their own personal world views. The Festival creates events and spaces where such films can be displayed, discussed and celebrated. It welcomes participants from all faith backgrounds and none and focuses particularly on young filmmakers. In doing so it wants to make positive contributions to understanding, respect and community cohesion. IFF organises an awards ceremony to reward film of excellence and relevance to the objectives of each prize. IFF is not a religious organisation: it is a Community Interest Company that allows space for discussion, learning and screening films. The Festival welcomes filmmakers and other participants of all faiths and none to take part. IFF continues to expand into new areas of work outside the Festival itself: expansion of awards; education events; Insight Annual Lectures; workshops; curation projects; and participation within other film festivals and other relevant events to screen an Insight strand.

History

1st Insight Film Festival 
Venue, Nexus Arts Cafe Manchester (2007)

The Festival was launched in 2007 as an initiative of religious and education television producer John Forrest with the support and encouragement of the Centre for Screen Studies at the University of Manchester, through the personal involvement of Dr David Butler and other media practitioners from the Centre. The initial idea of IFF was to publicise an invitation to make a film about faith, with a prize of £1000 attached alongside a seminar event to discuss faith in the context of film. Response exceeded expectation and convinced the organisers to run an expanded event in Manchester in 2009.

2nd Insight Film Festival 
Venue, Zion Arts Centre, Manchester, now called Z-arts (2009)

The 2nd IFF was a larger event than the inaugural gathering, which meant that the Festival moved to a larger venue, which remains the IFF's home in Manchester. The main innovation was the introduction of an awards ceremony that presented an award for the best film submitted to the festival (see Awards section). The 2nd IFF was the first to encourage filmmakers around the world to submit their work to a judging panel that considered the merits of quality and relevance to the theme of the films entered into the show.

3rd Insight Film Festival 
Venue, Z-arts, Manchester (3–4 December 2011)

More than 300 delegates attended the 3rd IFF, again held at Z-arts. The Festival in 2011 saw the introduction of the Insight Annual Lecture (see Lecture section), now a key part of the Festival's remit. The Festival comprised two days of screenings, workshops and discussions. The programme included a preview of a UK feature, viewings of over 50 short films from across the globe. The 3rd IFF managed and judged nine awards, which resulted in nine winning film entries and seven special commendations (see Awards section for full list of winners)

4th Insight Film Festival 
Venue, Z-arts, Manchester (15–17 March 2013)

The 4th IFF comprised three days of screenings, workshops and discussions, including presentations of short films from all over the world. Filmmakers from a total of 64 countries submitted their work for consideration for awards. On 15 March 2013 Insight held their first ‘Education Day’, an exclusive daytime event for local schools. At a special awards ceremony on 17 March 2013, winning films were announced in a range of categories, including the prestigious Coexist Award that bestows a cash prize of £1000 to the film that best depicts the ‘uniting of faith’ across the world’s religions (see Awards section for full list of winners)

Awards 

This section gives details of the prizes awards at each IFF, the members of the judging panels, the names of prize-winning filmmakers and those given special commendations, and the titles of the winning films:

1st Insight Film Festival 

The inaugural event introduced an award with a prize of £1000 for the best film about faith. The winning film was judged and announced at the 2nd IFF.

2nd Insight Film Festival 

The 2nd IFF presented the award announced at the 1st IFF and expand its offer to run more awards with their own judging panel and processes, and prizes, at the 3rd IFF event.

Premier Award 

Judging panel jury:
 * John Forrest (UK): Insight Film Festival Director
 * Dr David Butler (UK): Senior Lecturer in Screen Studies, University of Manchester
 * Aaqil Ahmed (UK): Head of Religion and Ethics; Commissioning Editor: Religion, BBC
 * Dr Rajinder Dudrah (UK): Head of Drama; Senior Lecturer in Screen Studies, University of Manchester

 Winner: Who’s Driving the Dreambus? (2009); Producer/Director/Screenwriter: Boris Jänsch, Baci Films (UK)

3rd Insight Film Festival 

The 3rd IFF presented awards in nine categories. The judging panel members, prize winning entries and films receiving special commendations are listed below:

Insight Premier Award (Best in Festival) 

Judging panel jury:
 * Tina Gharavi (Iran; USA; UK; New Zealand); filmmaker;
 * Mike Higton (UK): University of Exeter;
 * Gary Kurtz (USA); filmmaker
 * Fr Peter Malone (Australia); film critic
 * Nev Pierce (UK); filmmaker
 * Amanda Rice: BBC, head of diversity;
 * Liz Rymer (UK): Leeds Trinity University;
 * David N Weiss (USA); filmmaker

Winner: Looking After Edward (2011); Producer/Director: Alex Horsfall (UK)
Jury commendation: Caretaker for the Lord (2011); Producer/Director: Jane McAllister (UK)
Jury commendation: Mrs Carmella Prays (2010); Producer/Director/Screenwriter: Daneeta and Patrick Jackson (USA)
Festival Director’s personal commendation: Kosher (2010): Director: Isabelle Stead (UK)

Coexist Award 

 Judging panel jury:
 * Insight Premier Award panel, see above
 * Coexist Foundation

Winner: Schlimazeltov! (2009); Director: Christopher Allen (UK)

Insight Young Filmmakers Award 

 Judging panel jury:
 Insight Premier Award panel, see above

Winner: Akerbeltz, the Witches and the Inquisitor (2009); Director: César Urbina Vitoria (Spain)

SIGNIS Award 

 Judging panel: International SIGNIS jury:
 * Gustavo Andújar (Cuba);
 * Fr Peter Malone (Australia);
 * Guido Convents (Belgium): Festival Focus;
 * Davide Zordan (Italy): ISR, Religion Today Film Festival;
 * Jim McDonnell (UK): McDonnell Communications.

Winner: Project Jerusalem (2010); Director: Jenna Hill (USA)
Jury commendation: My Lad (2010); Director/Screenwriter: Sami Khan (UK)
Jury commendation: Mrs Carmella Prays (2010); Producer/Director/Screenwriter: Daneeta and Patrick Jackson (USA)

Rationalist Association Award 

 Judging panel: Rationalist Association Jury:
 * Insight Premier Award panel, see above;
 * Caspar Melville: editor, New Humanist magazine;
 * Rationalist Association.

Winner: The Backwater Gospel (2010); Director: Bo Mathorne (Denmark)
Jury commendation: My Lad (2010); Director/Screenwriter: Sami Khan (UK)
Jury commendation: Mea Culpa (2010): Director: Blanca Lopez (Colombia/Canada)

Framing British Muslims Awards 

 Judging panel: Framing British Muslims jury:

 * Insight Premier Award panel, see above;
 * Framing British Muslims.

Best overall submission 

Winner: My Lad (2010); Director/Screenwriter: Sami Khan (UK)

Best short 

Winner: Hope and Justice (2011); Director: Ala Elhoudiri (UK)

Young Voices Award 

Winner: Joe Nobody (2009): Director: Gimme 5 Collective, An-Nisa Society (UK)
Jury commendation: Ayan (2009); Director: Elays Network
Jury commendation: The Switch: Director:  Kannan Karthik Seetharaman

'Insight Audience Special Award 

 Judging panel jury:
 * An audience award judged by delegates at the 3rd IFF

Winner: Kinyarwanda (2010); Producer/Director/Screenwriter: Alrick Brown (USA)

Education 

IFF has introduced education events into the Festival's portfolio, which serves as a template for an education strand for future Festivals.

1st Education Day 

On 15 March 2013, IFF held the inaugural Insight Education Day, a programme of events for 14-19-year-old Manchester schoolchildren. The content of the day comprised:

 Screenings of winning entries to the 4th IFF;
 Discussions about the films, taking the form of presentations and Q&A sessions;
 Interactive seminars and workshops;
 Audience participation: casting votes for the best film.

2nd Education Event 

IFF is organising a second education event, to be held in Manchester on 12 February 2014. The event is aimed at schoolchildren aged 14–19 from local schools and will comprise:

 A showcase of short films by international filmmakers, from recent Insight Film Festivals;
 Discussions about filmmaking and Q&A about the Insight films;
 Technical filmmaking workshops with mentors from the University of Manchester Screen Studies Department.
 Interviews with filmmaking professionals;
 Screenings of the winning entries from the inaugural Insight Young Filmmakers Competition;
 Award ceremony for the Insight Young Filmmakers Competition.

References

External links 

Film festivals in Greater Manchester
Short film festivals in the United Kingdom